Moonspell is a Portuguese gothic metal band formed in 1992. The group released their first EP, Under the Moonspell, in 1994 and followed up with their debut album, Wolfheart, a year later. They quickly became the most recognizable metal band from Portugal and a key figure in gothic metal.

Moonspell achieved success in Portugal with their 1998 album Sin/Pecado. With Memorial (2006), the group also became the first Portuguese metal band to have a record certified Gold. They are also popular in Germany, where their albums consistently enter the Top 100 Chart.

History

Early days (1992–1994) 
Although they had been playing since 1989 under the name of "Morbid God", the band became Moonspell in 1992, shortly after they released the promo track "Serpent Angel". At the time of the name change, the band's line-up was Fernando Ribeiro (Langsuyar) on vocals, João Pedro "Ares" Escoval (Tetragrammaton) on bass, Duarte Picoto (Mantus) and Luís Lamelas (Malah) on the guitars, and Miguel "Mike" Gaspar (Nisroth) on the drums. Ribeiro and Ares were the founders and masterminds of Morbid God / Moonspell, while the latter members joined Morbid God at different points in 1992. Of them, only Mike Gaspar joined after the recording of "Serpent Angel".

On 24 February 1993, the band released their demo Anno Satanæ, which contained three songs accompanied by an intro and an outro. In September, Pedro Paixão joined the band to play keyboards. On 6 November 1993, Moonspell performed their first show in Charneca, Lisbon. Shortly after, Lamelas was fired and replaced by João Pereira (Tanngrisnir). The demo circulated around the black metal scene and eventually attracted the interest of independent label Adipocere Records, which signed the band for a mini-album.

On 27 April 1994, Moonspell released the mini-album Under the Moonspell and toured around Portugal to promote it and try to jump to a bigger label. After the release of mini-album Under the Moonspell, Moonspell signed with Century Media Records for six albums.

Breakthrough (1995–1997) 
Wolfheart was recorded in Germany with producer Waldemar Sorychta and was released on 1 April 1995. By June, João Pereira was struggling with the band's breakthrough and his daytime job, and was replaced by Ricardo Amorim, who was asked to join the band on 13 June. Shortly before, Ricardo had been approached by the band to possibly replace João on some shows, but that came to nothing as João was given a second chance.

In July, Moonspell performed three shows in the United Kingdom, their first ones outside Portugal, and in September, the band embarked on a European tour, supporting Morbid Angel. Duarte Picoto told the band he couldn't go on the European tour as he was having personal issues of his own, but they went on anyway, as they felt it was too big of an opportunity to throw away, and played as a five-piece. Ricardo, who had joined the band after Wolfhearts release, was then the sole guitarist playing live. Duarte's status in the band was on hold during the tour, as the band was initially reluctant about firing him due to his perceived importance on songwriting, but after it, the band felt comfortable as a five-piece and Duarte ended up not being reinstated.

For 1996's Irreligious, the band again recorded with producer Waldemar Sorychta. While the previous album was considered black metal, this one fell into the genre of gothic metal. The song "Opium" became the first Moonspell single. It quoted one of Portuguese poet Fernando Pessoa's heteronyms, Álvaro de Campos, on his poem "Opiário", and its music video featured the character of the poet writing in a bar with the band playing. Along with the release of the album in a convent, the Convento do Beato, there were factors that helped the band sell 10,000 copies of the album in their homeland.

On 7 February 1997, after serious artistic and personal conflicts with the rest of the band, bass player Ares was fired and was replaced by Sérgio Crestana. There were several lawsuits between Ares and Moonspell which were solved in 2004.

Experimenting (1998–2000) 
Sin/Pecado ("Without/Sin" and Pecado means "sin" in Portuguese) was released in 1998. It had a bigger experimental nature than its predecessors. The song "2econd Skin" was released as a single. At the time they released the one and only Dæmonarch album, Hermeticum. Dæmonarch was a side project composed by all Moonspell members except drummer Mike Gaspar. The album was seen as a return to their black metal roots and its lyrics were all written by singer Fernando Ribeiro between the age of 14 and 16.

Sin/Pecado was followed in 1999 by The Butterfly Effect, recorded in London and produced by Andy Reilly. This album is considered to be very experimental in nature as well. Featuring "down-tuned guitar riffs, eerie synthesizer passages", the album was mainly composed by guitarist/keyboard player Pedro Paixão and was not very well received by metal critics.

Darkness and Hope and The Antidote (2001–2005) 

Darkness and Hope was released in 2001 and was produced by Hiili Hiilesmaa, producer of Sentenced and HIM. The album reached 79th on German charts and special editions included covers of Madredeus, Ozzy Osbourne's "Mr. Crowley" and Joy Division's "Love Will Tear Us Apart". "Nocturna" was released as a single and music video.

In 2003, the band released The Antidote, with Niclas Etelävuori from Amorphis playing as a session musician on the bass guitar, as Sérgio Crestana left the band earlier that year. The album was released with a book with the same title written by Portuguese writer José Luís Peixoto. Both the CD and book share the same concept and story and each song in the CD is sister to a chapter in the book that enhances the story in the lyrics. "Everything Invaded" was released as a single and music video. After the album's recording, Moonspell hired Aires Pereira as a touring bass player. The band toured extensively around the world, playing at Rock in Rio Lisbon in 2004, a concert that brought them to more mainstream attention in Portugal.

During 2003 the band recorded a cover of the jazz standard "I'll See You in My Dreams" for the soundtrack of the Portuguese short zombie horror film of the same name. There is an official music video which was filmed in one day during the production of the short and under a €2,000 budget. The song was also issued as a single in 2004, featuring the full and edited versions.

Memorial, Under Satanæ and Night Eternal (2006–2009) 
Memorial was released in 2006. Recorded with the producer of their first three albums Waldemar Sorychta, who also recorded the bass guitar parts, it was the first to be released under their new label SPV Steamhammer. The album topped the Portuguese album chart on its first week and also broke into the German Top 100 at number 68. Memorial achieved gold status in Portugal after selling 10,000 copies, making Moonspell the first Portuguese doom metal band to achieve that.

Although the album is heavier than the previous, it was very well received and its release was featured in various Portuguese news broadcasts. A new release of the album was released in December 2006 and featured a DVD with live performances and the music videos made for the album. Music videos for "Finisterra" and "Luna" were released.

The band then worked on releasing a DVD originally entitled Lunar Still/13 Years of Doom, but had some issues of a legal nature and was forced to delay the release, originally expected in September 2005. It was pushed later to 9 December 2008 with a new title: Lusitanian Metal.

On 2 November 2006, Moonspell won an MTV Europe Music Award in the category of Best Portuguese Act.

The Great Silver Eye, a best-of album, was released on 26 June 2007.

In 2007, Moonspell released Under Satanæ, a re-recording of early songs.

Night Eternal was released on 16 May 2008, again with Niclas Etelävuori on bass. The lead single off the album, Scorpion Flower, features Dutch singer Anneke van Giersbergen (ex-The Gathering, now Agua De Annique).

Moonspell performed the "Blackest of the Black" tour with Danzig, Winds of Plague, Dimmu Borgir and Skeletonwitch.

Moonspell toured Europe with Cradle of Filth, Gorgoroth, Septicflesh and Asrai ("The Darkest Tour: Filthfest") in December 2008, and took part in a European tour  with Cradle of Filth and Turisas, dubbed the "Darkest Tour:Filthfest 2", in April and May 2009.

In July 2010 it was reported that the Portuguese Postal Service would release "a collection of stamps that represent the most significant rock moments and records from Portugal," which included Moonspell's first album, Wolfheart.

Alpha Noir and Omega White, Extinct, 1755, and Hermitage (2010–present) 

In July 2010, vocalist Fernando Ribeiro revealed the band was working on a new album, which he described as "the most exciting, sexiest, darkest, heaviest and catchiest stuff we've written in ages!". In December 2011 Moonspell signed with Napalm Records, and Ribeiro released the following statement:
 Around the same time, Aires Pereira was admitted as a full member of the band, after playing live with them for eight years.

In January 2012, Moonspell revealed the title of the new album to be Alpha Noir, with a release date of 27 April 2012 and a special edition set to include the album's "musical twin", Omega White. The band's press release cited Bathory, King Diamond, Onslaught, early Metallica, Testament, and Artillery as influences for Alpha Noir, which was described as "an incendiary album". Omega White was instead described as an album of "pure atmosphere and shadow", an homage to Type O Negative and The Sisters of Mercy and similar to Moonspell's second album Irreligious. Alpha Noir and Omega White were both produced and mixed by Tue Madsen, who had previously worked on the band's Under Satanæ and Night Eternal records.

In 2015, Moonspell released a new album titled Extinct. This album continued Moonspell's trend into darker and more gothic music.

On 3 November 2017, they released a concept album named 1755. It detailed the story of the 1755 Lisbon earthquake, and was sung entirely in Portuguese, apart from some choirs in Latin.

On 3 July 2020, Moonspell announced that Mike Gaspar, the original drummer, had left the band, and that he would be replaced by Hugo Ribeiro.

On 26 February 2021, Moonspell released a new album called Hermitage.

Band members 
Current members
 Fernando Ribeiro (Langsuyar) – lead vocals (1992–present)
 Pedro Paixão (Passionis/Neophytus) – keyboards, sampler, programming (1993–present), rhythm guitar (2003–2015; 2021–present)
 Ricardo Amorim (Morning Blade) – lead guitar, backing vocals (1995–present)
 Aires Pereira (Ahriman) – bass (2003–present; Touring 2003–2011)
 Hugo Ribeiro – drums (2020–present; Touring 2020)

Former members
 Miguel Gaspar (Mike/Nisroth) – drums (1992–2020)
 João Pedro Escoval (Ares/Tetragrammaton) – bass (1992–1997)
 Duarte Picoto (Mantus) – lead guitar (1992–1995)
 Luís Lamelas (Malah/Fenrir) – rhythm guitar (1992–1993)
 João Pereira (Tanngrisnir) – rhythm guitar, backing vocals (1993–1995)
 Sérgio Crestana – bass (1997–2003; Touring 1997)

Timeline

Discography

Studio albums

Live albums

Compilations

EPs

Video albums

Demos

Music videos

References

External links 

 Official website
 

1992 establishments in Portugal
Portuguese heavy metal musical groups
Portuguese folk metal musical groups
Portuguese gothic metal musical groups
Progressive metal musical groups
Musical quintets
Musical groups established in 1992
Century Media Records artists
Napalm Records artists
Steamhammer Records artists
MTV Europe Music Award winners